Anna Kovács (born 24 October 1991) is a retired Hungarian handballer for Debreceni VSC and the Hungarian national team.

On 19 October 2011 she also debuted in the Hungarian national team on a European Championship qualifier against Azerbaijan.

References

External links

Anna Kovács career statistics on Worldhandball

1991 births
Living people
People from Békéscsaba
Hungarian female handball players
Békéscsabai Előre NKSE players
Sportspeople from Békés County
21st-century Hungarian women